Hyaloseris is a genus of South American flowering plants in the family Asteraceae.

 Species
 Hyaloseris andrade-limae Cristóbal & Cabrera - Santiago del Estero in Argentina
 Hyaloseris camataquiensis Hieron. ex Fiebrig. - Bolivia, Jujuy in Argentina
 Hyaloseris catamaquiensis Kosterm. - Jujuy in Argentina
 Hyaloseris cinerea (Griseb.) Griseb. - Catamarca in Argentina
 Hyaloseris longicephala B.L.Turner - Bolivia
 Hyaloseris quadriflora J.Koster - Bolivia
 Hyaloseris rubicunda Griseb. - Argentina (Catamarca, La Rioja, Salta, San Juan, Tucumán)

References

Asteraceae genera
Flora of South America
Stifftioideae